"Guts Over Fear" is a song by American rapper Eminem featuring Australian singer-songwriter Sia, from Eminem's compilation album SHADYXV, released on August 25, 2014. This song is included in the closing credits of the film, The Equalizer.

Background
Previews of the song premiered in trailers and during the end credits for the film, The Equalizer starring Denzel Washington. The song was officially released to iTunes on August 25, 2014, the same day Eminem announced his plans to release an album later that year.

Content
The song's subject matter concerns Eminem and his struggles as an artist, and touches on moments of his career. Australian singer Sia provides the chorus, making this the second time the artists have collaborated, the first being "Beautiful Pain" from the deluxe version of The Marshall Mathers LP 2.

Music video
Eminem posted a picture on Instagram to serve as a sneak peek for the upcoming music video. The video premiered on November 24, via VEVO, was filmed in Detroit, Michigan, directed by Syndrome and starred Alexander Wraith and America's Next Top Model cycle 21 contestant, Winnie Harlow.

Chart performance
The song debuted at number 22 on the Billboard Hot 100, selling 134,328 copies in its first week of release.

Track listing
Digital Download

Charts

Weekly charts

Year-end charts

Certifications

References

External links
Guts Over Fear on YouTube
Full Lyrics at LyricsOnDemand.com

Eminem songs
2014 singles
Interscope Records singles
Shady Records singles
Aftermath Entertainment singles
Songs written by Eminem
2014 songs
Songs written by Sia (musician)
Song recordings produced by Emile Haynie
Songs written by Emile Haynie
Sia (musician) songs
Songs written by Luis Resto (musician)
Song recordings produced by John Hill (record producer)